George "Little Mitch" Mitchell (March 8, 1899 – May 22, 1972) was an American jazz cornet player active in the 1920s.

Early life 
Mitchell was born in Louisville, Kentucky. He began playing the cornet at the age of 12 and joined a local brass band in Louisville.

Career 
From 1921 to 1923, Mitchell recorded with Johnny Dunn's Original Jazz Hounds and Johnny Dunn's Original Jazz Band on the Columbia label. In 1926, he recorded with the New Orleans Wanderers and New Orleans Bootblacks, taking the place of the unavailable Louis Armstrong, and shortly afterwards recorded with Jelly Roll Morton's Red Hot Peppers. He also recorded with Luis Russell, Johnny Dodds and The Earl Hines Orchestra.
 
He ceased to be active in music about 1931 and became a bank messenger.

References

External links
 

1899 births
1972 deaths
American jazz cornetists
Jazz musicians from New Orleans
Musicians from Louisville, Kentucky
20th-century American musicians
Jazz musicians from Kentucky
20th-century trumpeters
American jazz trumpeters
American male trumpeters
20th-century American male musicians
American male jazz musicians
Red Hot Peppers members
New Orleans Wanderers members